Arnold Anderson Stadium at Cockshutt Park is a baseball venue located in Brantford, Ontario and home to the Brantford Red Sox of the Intercounty Baseball League and the Brantford Jr. Red Sox of the Junior Intercounty Baseball League. Cockshutt Park is named after the former Lieutenant Governor of Ontario Henry Cockshutt, while Arnold Anderson Stadium was named for local broadcaster Arnold Anderson in 1998.

An episode of Due South, "Dr. Long Ball", was filmed at the stadium.

Baseball venues in Ontario
Minor league baseball venues
Buildings and structures in Brantford